= Irradiation Facility (CERN) =

The CERN East Area is important for test-beams. The programme was approved by the CERN Research Board in February 2012.

== Irradiation Facility Research Programme ==
LHC experiments
Experiment	Spokesperson	Description	Link
EA-IRRAD Mixed-Field (CHARM)	Markus Brugger	Mixed field irradiation facility in the PS East Area	Grey Book
EA-IRRAD Proton (IRRAD)	Federico Ravotti	Proton irradiation facility in the PS East Area	Grey Book
GIF++	Martin R. Jaekel	Gamma irradiation facility in the SPS North Area	Grey Book
HiRadMat	Nikos Charitonidis	High-radiation to materials	Grey Book
